Başköy may refer to:

Başköy, Kurucaşile, a village in the District of Kurucaşile, Bartın Province, Turkey
Başköy, Arhavi, a village in the District of Arhavi, Artvin Province, Turkey
Başköy, Bilecik, a village in the District of Bilecik, Bilecik Province, Turkey
Başköy, Murgul, a village in the District of Murgul, Artvin Province, Turkey
Başköy, Çıldır, a village in the District of Çıldır, Ardahan Province, Turkey
Başköy, Alanya, a village in the District of Alanya, Antalya Province, Turkey
Başköy, Antalya, a village in the District of Antalya, Antalya Province, Turkey
Başköy, Cide, a village in Cide
Başköy, Bismil
Başköy, Çat
Başköy, Çayırlı
Başköy, Dicle
Başköy, Hınıs
Başköy, İspir
Başköy, Kargı
Başköy, Nilüfer
Başköy, Orhaneli
Başköy, Pınarbaşı, a village

See also
Başkənd (disambiguation)
Bashkend (disambiguation)